Kushk-e Esmailabad (also Romanized as Kūshk-e Esmā‘īlābād; also known as Kūshk) is a village in Khvajehei Rural District, Meymand District, Firuzabad County, Fars Province, Iran. At the 2006 census, its population was 458, in 104 families.

References 

Populated places in Firuzabad County